"Sexy Boy" is a song by French music duo Air, released in February 1998 as the debut single from their first album, Moon Safari (1998). It is noted for allowing the band, and French dance music more generally, to break through to British and American markets. The song peaked at number 12 on the UK Singles Chart and number 22 on the US Billboard Hot Dance Club Play chart. It was also a top-20 hit in Finland and a top-30 hit in Iceland.

Critical reception
British newspaper Sunday Mirror rated the song ten out of ten, writing, "Dotty french duo come up with the best single of the year so far. Sounds like Kraftwerk meeting Daft Punk and going for a picnic with Aqua."

Music video
The accompanying music video for "Sexy Boy", directed by American film and music video director Mike Mills, shows the members of Air in New York City. They see a toy monkey on the street and immediately enter a fantasy in which the monkey is a giant and flies off to the Moon. Meanwhile, the members of Air are still in New York and other people see them playing with the toy monkey around the United Nations headquarters and in Central Park. The fantasy scenes are shown in colorful animation and the scenes in real life are shot in black-and-white live action. The music video went into rotation on JBTV.

Track listings
 US CD single
 "Sexy Boy" (radio edit) – 3:51
 "Sexy Boy" (Sex Kino Mix by Beck) – 6:33
 "Sexy Boy" (Cassius Radio Mix) – 4:33
 "Sexy Boy" (Étienne de Crécy & the Flower Pistols remix) – 4:57
 "Jeanne" (with Françoise Hardy) – 4:24

 UK CD single
 "Sexy Boy" (radio edit) – 3:51
 "Sexy Boy" (Cassius Radio Mix) – 4:33
 "Sexy Boy" (Étienne de Crécy & the Flower Pistols remix) – 4:57
 "Jeanne" (with Françoise Hardy) – 4:24

 French CD single
 "Sexy Boy" (radio edit) – 3:51
 "New Star in the Sky" (Chanson Pour Soleil) – 5:38

Charts

Certifications

Release history

Covers
Former Chemlab vocalist Jared Louche covered "Sexy Boy" with The Aliens for his 1999 solo debut Covergirl. The song was later covered by Franz Ferdinand and appears as a B-side to the single "Walk Away". "Sexy Boy" was also covered by German artist Nena on her 2007 cover album Cover Me. It was also covered by the French group Plastiscines on their 2014 album Back to the Start.

A newly scored orchestral version of the track was released in December 2010, under the artist "The Fallen Angels". The orchestra and choir arrangement was created by composer Roger Neill, who has been a long-time collaborator with Air since his extensive work on their 2001 album 10,000 Hz Legend. This version of the track is featured in a television advertising campaign for Lynx in the UK and Axe in the US and Europe.

References

1998 debut singles
1998 songs
Air (French band) songs
Caroline Records singles
Songs written by Nicolas Godin
Songs written by Jean-Benoît Dunckel